In some cases the surname Gunn is derived from the Old Norse masculine personal name Gunnr. In other cases it may be derived from the Old Norse feminine personal name Gunnhildr.

People with the surname
 Alexander Gunn (politician), Canadian politician
 Angus Gunn, footballer
 Anna Gunn, actress
 Anton Gunn, American politician
 Austin Gunn, ring name of American professional wrestler Austin Sopp (born 1994), son of Billy Gunn
 Bart Gunn, ring name of American professional wrestler Mike Polchlopek (born 1963)
 Battiscombe Gunn (1883–1950), Egyptologist
 Ben Gunn (guitarist), British guitarist with The Sisters of Mercy
 Billy Gunn, ring name of American professional wrestler Monty Sopp (born 1963)
 Bobby Gunn, Canadian boxer
 Bryan Gunn, Scottish footballer
 Chanda Gunn, American ice hockey goaltender
 Charles Gunn (actor) (1883–1918), American actor
 Charles Gunn (athlete) (1885–1983), British racewalker and Olympic medalist
 Charles A. Gunn (1870–1945?), American architect
 Colten Gunn, ring name of American professional wrestler Colten Sopp (born 1991), son of Billy Gunn
 Daniel Gunn (minister) (1774–1848), Scottish congregational minister
 David Gunn (disambiguation)
 Donald Gunn, Manitoba politician
 Eileen Gunn, an American science fiction author and editor
 Genni Gunn, Canadian novelist, poet, and translator
 Gia Gunn, Japanese-American drag queen
 Graham Gunn, Australian politician
 Greg Gunn (died 2016), African American fatally shot by police
 J. B. Gunn (1928–2008), British-American physicist, inventor of the Gunn diode
 James Gunn (disambiguation)
 Jason Gunn, New Zealand television personality
 Jeannie Gunn, pen name "Mrs Aeneas Gunn", Australian novelist
 John Gunn (disambiguation)
 Lance Gunn (born 1970), American football player
 Marc Gunn, a Celtic music musician.
 Moira Gunn, radio host
 Moses Gunn, actor
 Neil M. Gunn, Scottish novelist, critic, and dramatist
 Nathan Gunn, opera baritone
 Richard Gunn (boxer), boxer
 Ronald Campbell Gunn, botanist
 Ross Gunn, American physicist
 Sean Gunn, American actor
 Sean Gunn (swimmer), Zimbabwean swimmer
 Terry Gunn (1935–2021), English cricketer
 Tim Gunn, designer
 Thom Gunn, British poet
 Trey Gunn, bass guitarist with the band King Crimson
 Walter T. Gunn (1879–1956), American jurist
 William Gunn (disambiguation), several people

Fictional characters
 Ben Gunn (Treasure Island), fictional character in Robert Louis Stevenson's novel Treasure Island
 Charles Gunn (Angel), fictional character from the popular TV series Angel
 Peter Gunn, private eye protagonist of Peter Gunn, a 1958–1963 American television series
 Tommy Gunn, fictional character from the movie Rocky V

See also
 Clan Gunn, Scottish clan
 Westside Gunn, American Rapper

Citations

References

English-language surnames
Scottish surnames